SAS Australia may refer to:
 Special Air Service Regiment – a special forces unit of the Australian Army 
 SAS Australia: Who Dares Wins – a reality television show that features military-style training